Alison Roberta Noble Neilans (19 June 1884 – 17 July 1942) was an English suffragette. Neilans was a member of the executive committee of the Women's Freedom League, a member of the Church League for Women's Suffrage and the East London Federation of Suffragettes, where she worked with Sylvia Pankhurst. She was also a member of the board of the International Woman Suffrage Alliance.

Life
Neilans was born at East Dulwich, Surrey on 19 June 1884. She had a good life until her father died when she was age 12, and she was obliged to work as a bookkeeper. She became the financial secretary of the Women's Freedom League in 1908.

Neilans was imprisoned three times for her activities; twice, for one month each occurrence, in 1908 and once, for three months, in 1909.  Her third prison sentence was for pouring liquid into ballot boxes at a local by-election. She and Alice Chapin splashed chemicals over the ballot papers in the 1909 Bermondsey by-election. Chapin was successful in damaging many ballot papers, and Neilans damaged a few. All of the ballot papers still were readable, and John Dumphreys was elected. However George Thorley, the presiding officer, had chemicals splashed in his eye. At their trial, the doctors said that Thorley may have a haze over his eyes for life. The suffragettes believed that Thorley had exaggerated his injury and that the damage was caused to his applying ammonia after the incident in an panicked attempt to alleviate damage.

Chapin and Neilans were tried at the Old Bailey, and Neilans later published an account of their defence. Chapin was given a larger sentence than Neilans, but she was released two days after her under the "King's Pardon".

In August 1913, Neilans was the speaker for the daily meetings of the Women's Freedom League 'Clyde Coast Campaign', which included Rothesay, Largs and Dunoon.

References 

 
 
 

1884 births
1942 deaths
English suffragists
English feminists
Members of the Workers' Socialist Federation
People from East Dulwich